Hot Country Songs is a chart that ranks the top-performing country music songs in the United States, published by Billboard magazine.  In 1983, 50 different releases topped the chart, then published under the title Hot Country Singles, in 52 issues of the magazine, based on playlists submitted by country music radio stations and sales reports submitted by stores.

One of only two singles to spend more than one week at number one in 1983 was "Islands in the Stream", a collaboration between two of country's leading solo singers, Kenny Rogers and Dolly Parton.  The song was a considerable crossover success, also topping the Adult Contemporary chart and reaching number one on the all-genres Billboard Hot 100.  In 2005 the song topped a poll run by country music television channel CMT of the best country duets of all time.  The only other multi-week number one was "Houston (Means I'm One Day Closer to You)" by Larry Gatlin and the Gatlin Brothers, which ended the year in the top spot.  Five acts tied for the most number ones of the year, with three each, including Alabama, Crystal Gayle and John Anderson.  Mickey Gilley achieved two solo number ones and also teamed with Charly McClain on the chart-topping duet "Paradise Tonight" and Merle Haggard similarly gained two solo number ones and spent a week at the top with "Pancho and Lefty", a collaboration with Willie Nelson.

In addition to the artists who achieved three number ones, Kenny Rogers also spent three weeks at the top, as his two weeks in collaboration with Dolly Parton followed a week spent at number one with "We've Got Tonight", a duet with Sheena Easton.  Male-female duets had long been a staple of country music, and a fourth such song to top the Hot Country chart in 1983 was "Faking Love" by T. G. Sheppard and Karen Brooks.  In January Reba McEntire topped the chart for the first time with "Can't Even Get the Blues".  McEntire would go on to become one of the most successful female singers in country music history, topping the chart regularly for nearly three decades; in 2011 she achieved her 25th number one song, tying with Dolly Parton for the most chart-topping songs by a female artist.  While McEntire began a decades-long run of number ones in 1983, several veteran singers added to their extensive tallies of chart-toppers during the year; Merle Haggard's three number ones took his career total to 32 spanning 17 years, and Ronnie Milsap continued a run of number ones which had begun in 1974 and included 13 appearances in the top spot between 1980 and 1984.

Chart history

a.  Double A-sided single

See also
1983 in music
List of artists who reached number one on the U.S. country chart

References

1983
1983 record charts
Country